Guioa bicolor is a species of plant in the family Sapindaceae. It is endemic to the Philippines.

References

bicolor
Endemic flora of the Philippines
Vulnerable plants
Taxonomy articles created by Polbot
Plants described in 1921
Taxa named by Elmer Drew Merrill